This is a list of schools in the Roman Catholic Diocese of El Paso.

K-12 schools
 Loretto Academy, El Paso (non-diocesan)

High schools
 Cathedral High School, El Paso
 Father Yermo High School, El Paso (non-diocesan)

Elementary schools
 Most Holy Trinity Catholic School
 St. Joseph Catholic School
 St. Matthew Catholic School
 St. Patrick Catholic School 
 St. Pius X Catholic School 
 St. Raphael Catholic School

 Non-Diocesan
 Father Yermo Catholic Elementary School

References

External links
 El Paso Catholic Diocese Schools

El Paso, Roman Catholic Diocese of
Education in El Paso, Texas